Robert Doherty (29 May 1891 – February 1967) was an Irish hurler who played as a left wing-back for the Clare and Dublin senior teams.

Doherty made his first appearance for the Clare team during the 1913 championship and was a regular on the inter-county scene until his retirement from the Dublin team after the 1925 championship. During that time he won three All-Ireland medals, three Leinster medals and one Munster medal. Doherty was an All-Ireland runner-up on one occasion.

At club level Doherty began his career winning two county club championship medals with Newmarket-on-Fergus. He later won four county club championship medals with Faughs.

References

1891 births
1967 deaths
Newmarket-on-Fergus hurlers
Faughs hurlers
Clare inter-county hurlers
Dublin inter-county hurlers
All-Ireland Senior Hurling Championship winners